The Ponchatoula Commercial Historic District, in Tangipahoa Parish, Louisiana in Ponchatoula, Louisiana, was listed on the National Register of Historic Places in 1982. Eleven of the early 20th century buildings have been determined to be historically significant.

The following is an excerpt from the National Register of Historic Places nomination:

References

National Register of Historic Places in Tangipahoa Parish, Louisiana